Local elections was held in  Zamboanga City on May 14, 2007, within the Philippine general election. The voters elected for the elective local posts in the city: the mayor, vice mayor, and eight councilors per district. Previously, the city voters elected 12 councilors and one representative from its lone district.

Political changes

Since 1984, Zamboanga City is represented in the national Congress by one representative. All things changed in 2004 when the lone district was divided into 2 districts by virtue of Republic Act No. 9269 on March 19, 2004. Veterans Avenue is the dividing line of the two districts.

Mayoral and vice mayoral elections
Monsignor Crisanto dela Cruz formed a coalition named Nuevo Zamboanga under the banner of Kabalikat ng Malayang Pilipino of President Gloria Macapagal Arroyo to run against the incumbent administrator of Mayor Celso Lobregat of the Laban ng Demokratikong Pilipino. Lobregat picked incumbent Councilor Milabel Velasquez as his running mate while dela Cruz picked activist Atty. Victor Solis as his running mate.

Results
The candidates for district representative, mayor, and vice mayor with the most votes wins the seat; they are voted separately, therefore, they may be of different parties when elected.

District I City Election Officer Roel Bengua, also chairman of the City Board of Canvassers, proclaimed Mayor Celso Lobregat retaining his post, incumbent Councilor Mannix Dalipe as Vice-Mayor, incumbent Vice-Mayor Beng Climaco as District I Representative, Congressman Erbie Fabian as District II Representative, and the 16 City Councilors.

House of Representatives election

1st District
Incumbent Vice-Mayor Maria Isabelle Climaco is running for the post against neophyte politician Edilberto Gonzales.

2nd District
Incumbent Representative Erico Basilio Fabian is running for a second term.

Mayoral elections
Incumbent Mayor Celso Lobregat is running for his second term.

Vice-mayoral elections
Incumbent Vice-Mayor Beng Climaco is running for District I Representative. Councilor Mila Velasquez was Mayor Lobregat's running-mate against Monsi dela Cruz' candidate, Atty. Vic Solis.

City Council elections
Each of Zamboanga City's two legislative districts elects eight councilors to the City Council. The eight candidates with the most votes wins the seats per district.

1st District

|-bgcolor=black
|colspan=5|

2nd District

|-bgcolor=black
|colspan=5|

See also
Philippine House of Representatives elections in the Zamboanga Peninsula, 2007
2007 Philippine general election

References

External links
Official website of the Commission on Elections
 Official website of National Movement for Free Elections (NAMFREL)
Official website of the Parish Pastoral Council for Responsible Voting (PPCRV)

2007 Philippine local elections
Elections in Zamboanga City